The 1979 World Table Tennis Championships mixed doubles was the 35th edition of the mixed doubles championship.  

Liang Geliang and Ge Xin'ai defeated Li Zhenshi and Yan Guili in the final by three sets to nil.

Results

See also
 List of World Table Tennis Championships medalists

References

-